Godspeed, under Captain Bartholomew Gosnold, was one of the three ships (along with Susan Constant and Discovery) on the 1606–1607 voyage to the New World for the English Virginia Company of London. The journey resulted in the founding of Jamestown in the new Colony of Virginia.

History
The 40-ton Godspeed was a fully rigged ship estimated to have been  in length. 

As part of the original fleet to Virginia, leaving on December 20, 1606, she carried 39 passengers, all male, and 13 sailors. The route included a stop in the Canary Islands and Puerto Rico and, with better wind, would have taken about two months to traverse; instead, the voyage lasted 144 days. On June 22, 1607, Newport sailed back for London with Susan Constant and Godspeed carrying a load of supposedly precious minerals, leaving behind the 104 colonists and Discovery (to be used in exploring the area).

Replicas
In 1985, a replica of Godspeed (rigged as a baroque, only 48 feet on deck) sailed from London back to Virginia.  She had a crew of 14 and stopped at many places that the original Godspeed visited, including the Canary Islands and various places in the Windward Islands, before sailing to Jamestown.

The most recent replica was built at Rockport Marine in Rockport, Maine, and completed in early 2006. Replicas of Godspeed and her sisters in the 1607 voyage, the larger Susan Constant and the smaller Discovery, are docked in the James River at Jamestown Settlement (formerly Jamestown Festival Park), adjacent to the Jamestown National Historic Site.

Modern depictions

In May 2007, the United States Postal Service issued the first 41 cent denomination first class stamp.  The stamp had an image of Susan Constant, Godspeed, and Discovery. Godspeed was also depicted on Virginia's coin of the 50 State Quarters, in celebration of the quadricentennial of Jamestown.

See also
 Ship replica (including a list of ship replicas)

References

Further reading

 Price, David A. Love and Hate in Jamestown. Alfred A. Knopf (2003). Chapter 3.
 qsl.net for more information about the 1985 Voyage of Godspeed.
 rockportmarine.com for more information about the construction of the replica of Godspeed.
 molnarcraft.com plans of Godspeed.
 Jamestown-Yorktown Settlement website

English colonization of the Americas
Exploration ships of England
History of the Thirteen Colonies
Replica ships
1600s ships